Kuntur Wasi (Quechua kuntur condor, wasi rock, "condor house", also spelled Condorhuasi) is a mountain in the Wansu mountain range in the Andes of Peru, about  high. It is situated in the Apurímac Region, Antabamba Province, Juan Espinoza Medrano District. Kuntur Wasi lies west of the peaks of Quri Pawkara and northwest of Yana Uqhu and Yuraq Qaqa.

References 

Mountains of Peru
Mountains of Apurímac Region